Herminium ophioglossoides is a species of plant in the family Orchidaceae. It is endemic to China, known from the provinces of Sichuan and Yunnan.

References

Endemic orchids of China
ophioglossoides
Flora of Yunnan
Flora of Sichuan
Vulnerable plants
Plants described in 1912
Taxonomy articles created by Polbot